Mathias Andreas Marie (Thijs) Wöltgens (30 November 1943 Kerkrade - 7 May 2008) was a Dutch politician. He served as the mayor of the Kerkrade, a town on the German border in the southeast of the Netherlands, from 1994 until 2000. Wöltgens was also a Senator from 1995 until 2005.

Thijs Wöltgens died in Kerkrade on 7 May 2008, at the age of 64 of a heart attack.

See also 
 List of mayors of Kerkrade

References 

1943 births
2008 deaths
Dutch corporate directors
Labour Party (Netherlands) politicians
Mayors of Kerkrade
Members of the House of Representatives (Netherlands)
Members of the Senate (Netherlands)
People from Kerkrade